The Clue of the New Pin may refer to:

 The Clue of the New Pin (novel), a 1923 novel by Edgar Wallace
 The Clue of the New Pin (1929 film), a 1929 British film adaptation
 The Clue of the New Pin (1961 film), a 1961 British film adaptation